Tower House, also known as Edgewater and Marsland-on-the-Potomac, is a historic home located near Alexandria, in Fairfax County, Virginia.  The original portion was built in 1888 by John Young, who inherited the land from his father, Lewis, in 1879. At that time it was in the Italian Villa style.  An addition was added to the rear in 1888-9 by owner, Isaac N. Jones. The house was remodeled to its present form in 1900-1901 by railroad executive James Yeomans. James A. Drain, Sr. owned it from 1920 until 1936. He renamed it Marsland-on-the-Potomac after the maiden name of his wife Ethel. From 1941 until 1994, the religious group Baraca Philathea used it for various purposes. Since then, it has undergone extensive restoration by its present owner.
It is a -story frame dwelling in a transitional Queen Anne-Colonial Revival style.  It features a steeply pitched hipped roof and a prominent, semi-circular corner tower.

It was listed on the National Register of Historic Places in 2006.

References

Houses on the National Register of Historic Places in Virginia
Queen Anne architecture in Virginia
Colonial Revival architecture in Virginia
Houses completed in 1901
Houses in Fairfax County, Virginia
National Register of Historic Places in Fairfax County, Virginia